West Somerset was a local government district in the English county of Somerset. According to figures released by the Office for National Statistics in 2009, the population of West Somerset has the oldest average age in the United Kingdom at 52.
The largest centres of population are the coastal towns of Minehead (population 10,000) and Watchet (4,400).

The council's administrative headquarters were located in the village of Williton, with an additional office in Minehead.

In September 2016, West Somerset and Taunton Deane councils agreed in principle to merge the districts into one (with one council) subject to consultation. The new district would not be a unitary authority: it would still be part of the Somerset County Council area. In March 2018 both councils voted in favour of the merger and it came into effect on 1 April 2019, with the first elections to the new council in May 2019. The new authority is known as Somerset West and Taunton Council.

History
The district was formed on 1 April 1974, under the Local Government Act 1972, by a merger of the previous urban districts of Minehead and Watchet, along with Dulverton Rural District and Williton Rural District.

Listed buildings
There were 33 Grade I listed buildings in West Somerset: the oldest are Culbone Church (one of the smallest churches in England, and pre-Norman in origin) and Tarr Steps, which some say originates in the Bronze Age, although others date them from around 1400. Dunster has the greatest concentration of Grade I listed buildings including Dunster Castle, the Yarn Market, Gallox Bridge and Priory Church of St George. Other sites include manor houses such as Nettlecombe Court and Orchard Wyndham. The most recent buildings included in the list are Crowcombe Court which was completed in 1739 and the Church of St John the Baptist in Carhampton which was rebuilt in 1863. There are numerous religious structures in Somerset, with the largest number being Anglican parish churches, dating from Norman or medieval eras. Some of the churches are included in the Somerset towers, a collection of distinctive, mostly spireless Gothic church towers.

Recent financial difficulties
In 2012 financial difficulties at the council, including a £1 million reduction over three years, lead to plans to outsource most of the services provided to the population and make most of the staff redundant. It is proposed that some services may be shared with Taunton Deane council. In December 2012 the grant received from central government was increased by 0.9% meaning the council had £3.8million to spend on the provision of services.

Geography
West Somerset benefits from one of the most scenic landscapes in England. Nearly two-thirds of the western land area of the district forms part of Exmoor National Park, designated in 1954, while on the eastern edge of the district are the Quantock Hills, which in 1956 became the first Area of Outstanding Natural Beauty created in the UK. Large areas of Exmoor and the Quantock Hills are also designated as Sites of Special Scientific Interest because of their value for wildlife.

The West Somerset Railway runs through most of the district, from Bishop's Lydeard in the south east to Minehead in the north west. Operated mainly as a tourist attraction, the railway runs mostly steam and some diesel locomotives.

Governance

West Somerset District Council was elected every four years, with 28 councillors being elected at each election. From the first election to the council in 1973 to the 1995 election the council had a majority of independents. Since then the Conservative Party won a majority at the 2003 election, but independents took a majority back at the 2007 election. Following the election in 2011 the Conservatives regained a majority, which they then held until the council's abolition in 2019.

Settlements
Allerford, Ashbeer
Battleton, Bickham, Bicknoller, Bilbrook, Bossington, Brandish Street, Bratton, Bridgetown, Brompton Ralph, Brompton Regis, Brushford
Carhampton, Chapel Cleeve, Churchtown, Clatworthy, Crowcombe, Crowcombe Heathfield, Culbone, Cutcombe
Dulverton, Dunster
East Quantoxhead, Elworthy, Escott, Exford, Exton
Flaxpool
Halsway, Hawkridge, Higher Vexford, Holford, Huish Champflower
Kilve, Kilton, Kingsbridge, Kingswood
Lawford, Leighland Chapel, Lilstock, Lower Vellow, Lower Vexford, Lower Weacombe, Luccombe, Luxborough, Lynch, Lyncombe
Minehead, Monksilver
Oare, Oareford, Old Cleeve
Pooltown, Porlock, Preston
Roadwater
St Audries, Sampford Brett, Selworthy, Simonsbath, Skilgate, Stoke Pero, Stogumber, Stogursey, Stringston
Timberscombe, Tivington, Torre, Treborough, Triscombe
Upton
Vellow
Washford, Watchet, Weacombe, West Quantoxhead, Williton, Winsford, Withycombe, Withypool, Woodford, Wootton Courtenay
Yarde

Parishes

Education

County schools (those which are not independent) in the five non-metropolitan districts of the county are operated by Somerset County Council.

For a full list of schools see: List of schools in Somerset

See also

List of Grade I listed buildings in West Somerset
Quay West Radio

References

External links
West Somerset District Council

 
Districts of England established in 1974
Former non-metropolitan districts of Somerset
Somerset West and Taunton